Asca aphidioides is a species of mite in the family Ascidae. It is found in western Europe and eastern regions of North America.

References

Further reading

 

aphidioides
Articles created by Qbugbot
Animals described in 1758
Taxa named by Carl Linnaeus